Nathan Allen (1813–1889) was a physician, social reformer, and public health advocate. 

Nathan Allen may also refer to:
 Nathan Allen (travel writer), American travel writer and photographer. 
 Nathan Allen, American chemist and forum moderator on the /r/science Reddit forum
 The Nathan Allen House, a historic house in Pawlet, Vermont